Floriano Peixoto Correia (14 May 1903 – 19 September 1938), known as just Floriano, was a Brazilian footballer. He played in three matches for the Brazil national football team in 1925. He was also part of Brazil's squad for the 1925 South American Championship.

References

External links
 

1903 births
1938 deaths
Brazilian footballers
Brazil international footballers
Sportspeople from Minas Gerais
Association football midfielders
Grêmio Foot-Ball Porto Alegrense players
Fluminense FC players
America Football Club (Rio de Janeiro) players
São Cristóvão de Futebol e Regatas players
Santos FC players